The Dark Pictures Anthology: House of Ashes is a 2021 interactive drama and survival horror video game with science fiction elements developed by Supermassive Games and published by Bandai Namco Entertainment. It is the third instalment in The Dark Pictures Anthology, after Man of Medan (2019) and Little Hope (2020). Continuing the series' premise, the game features a cast of five playable protagonists and a multilinear narrative influenced by player choices. Its decision-making scenes can significantly alter the trajectory of the plot and change the relationships between the main characters; some can lead to the permanent death of the protagonists.

Staple mechanics of The Dark Pictures Anthology, such as quick time events (QTEs) and "pictures", collectable items that allow players to see visions of possible future events, appear again in House of Ashes. The game also introduces new features, including a more interactive camera system and three difficulty levels to manage QTEs. Jason Graves, a long-time collaborator with Supermassive Games, returned to compose the game's soundtrack, having created music for the earlier games in the series.

House of Ashes takes heavy inspiration from the book At the Mountains of Madness and the films Predator and The Descent. Set during the 2003 invasion of Iraq, the plot follows five characters—four Americans working for the US Armed Forces and one Iraqi Republican Guard—who fall into a subterranean Akkadian temple after an Iraqi ambush. They must find a way out of the ancient structure and cooperate to outmatch the vampiric aliens that infest the area. Ashley Tisdale was marketed as the game's leading actress, marking the third time Supermassive Games cast a high-profile actor to portray a character for the series.

The game was released for PlayStation 4, PlayStation 5, Windows, Xbox One, and Xbox Series X/S on 22 October 2021. Its sequel, The Devil in Me, was released on 18 November 2022, serving as the final game in the anthology's first season. House of Ashes garnered mixed reviews from critics—some wrote it was a "step in the right direction" for The Dark Pictures Anthology, and others took issue with the gameplay's technical issues. Praise often focused on the multiplayer modes, the choice-and-consequence system, and the story and characters, all of which critics felt improved in quality compared to similar other games by Supermassive. Recurrent criticisms were about several bugs and glitches with the textures and animation, as well as the visual design of the monsters.

Gameplay 
House of Ashes is an interactive drama and survival horror game that is presented from a third-person perspective and is set during the 2003 invasion of Iraq. Players take control of five protagonists who are enlisted in the armed forces of their respective countries; the characters fall and become trapped in an underground Mesopotamian temple, where bat-like monsters awaken to hunt the characters. A core element of the gameplay involves the management of relationships between the characters, and their allies and enemies. Players can choose to be courageous and ensure the creatures do not kill anybody, or to continue alone and be concerned with their own personal safety. Facing a common foe, the Iraqi and American characters must decide whether they should ignore their differences and become allies to survive the attacks. Characters often quote the proverb "the enemy of my enemy is my friend", which is one of the story's recurring themes.

House of Ashes introduces two gameplay features that are a departure from those of Man of Medan and Little Hope, previous entries in The Dark Pictures Anthology. The camera is no longer fully fixed and has been replaced with a controllable, 360-degree one. House of Ashes is the first game in the series to feature difficulty levels, such as "forgiving", "challenging" and "lethal", which affect the game's quick time events (QTEs). To further adjust difficulty, players can choose which buttons to press for specific types of QTEs, and can customise the speed at which these prompts appear. The remainder of the features are consistent with those of the other two instalments. The game's developers at Supermassive Games said players will immediately understand House of Ashes mechanics if they have played either Man of Medan or Little Hope.

Players must make several choices that can have long-term consequences on the narrative's progression and the character's perceptions of each other. In these scenarios, there is a limited amount of time in which one can choose an action or a line of dialogue with which to respond. Protagonists may choose to say or do nothing when they are prompted to make a decision. An anatomical drawing of the brain and heart accompanies every choice in House of Ashes, indicating the player character may choose actions based on either rationality or emotion.

To track the narrative branches in one's playthrough, the game's menu has a butterfly effect system called "bearings", which lists all consequential courses of action associated with each branch and their eventual outcomes. The story is interspersed with cutscenes featuring an omnipresent observer called the Curator (Pip Torrens), a character who converses with players about the choices they have made and provides clues about what will happen next in the plot. The survival of all five protagonists depends on these critical decisions, and the game continues without the deceased characters. As a result, House of Ashes has multiple endings and includes over 60 death scenes.

House of Ashes includes elements of exploration and allows players to pick up collectables while searching and moving through locations, and a new light source mechanic aids players in underground navigation and inspection by illuminating dark paths that lay ahead. Several scenes in the game, including ones that are combat-heavy, make use of QTEs that can lead to penalties like a protagonist's death in case of failure to provide a precisely timed input. Many types of QTE involve pressing specific buttons—either once or repeatedly—to trigger actions from the player character, such as dodging an obstacle or keeping calm when hiding from a threat. Another type is the moving of a crosshair onto an on-screen target to shoot it. The game displays a notice whenever players are about to perform a QTE, illustrating the type of action the QTE is intended to perform.

The eponymous "pictures" mechanic from its predecessors makes a return. Pictures, which have either a black, white, or gold frame, trigger a vision of possible future story branches to help players make decisions. In line with earlier games in the series, 50 "secrets"—items that are scattered throughout House of Ashes—provide background information and context to events that happened in the temple and preceded the main plot. Secrets partly consist of journal entries written during the 1940s that, when picked up, activate a cutscene in which the author's voice recounts a contemporaneous archaeology mission that occurred in the temple.

Another holdover feature present in House of Ashes is the set of four gameplay modes with which the game could be played. The "Theatrical" and "Curator's Cut" modes are single-player, and "Movie Night" and "Shared Story" are multiplayer. Customers who pre-ordered the game gained access to the "Curator's Cut", a version of the story that shows mostly the same scenes that are viewed from the perspective and control of another protagonist, as well as the default "Theatrical Cut" mode. "Shared Story" and "Movie Night" offer the option to control the characters with another person; "Shared Story" acts as a two-player version of the game and "Movie Night" accommodates up to three more players. The multiplayer concept was inspired by live streamers' collaborative manner of playing Until Dawn (2015), another game by Supermassive Games, which prompted the developers to incorporate such a feature in their next releases.

Synopsis

Setting and prologue 

House of Ashes plot unfolds within the former territory of the ancient Akkadian Empire that existed in Mesopotamia around 4,000 years ago. In the game's timeline, it was the site of the crash-landing of a spaceship that carried thousands of large, bat-like aliens controlled by a parasite that gestates within the host's body. The disease caused the aliens to mutate into vampires that are vulnerable to ultraviolet light; they have hibernated underground for millennia, occasionally venturing to the surface to feed on their victims' adrenaline.

The prologue takes place in 2231 BC in the temple, located in Akkad. As a Gutian army prepares to invade Akkad, King Naram-Sin orders the mass sacrifice of Gutian prisoners in the city temple to help them win the battle. During the assault, a solar eclipse allows the aliens beneath the temple to slaughter both forces. Two survivors, Akkadian general Balathu and Gutian soldier Kurum, ignore their differences and work together as they flee into the temple catacombs. An alien quickly overwhelms Balathu and Kurum, presumably killing them.

Following the prologue, the game cuts to a scene of a library owned by the Curator. He introduces himself to the player and provides information about parts of House of Ashes gameplay, including the decision-making system and the pictures system.

Characters 

The game's five protagonists include Rachel King (Ashley Tisdale), a Central Intelligence Agency (CIA) operative working for the US Armed Forces, and her husband Eric King (Alex Gravenstein), who is a lieutenant colonel in the Air Force. Rounding out the ensemble cast's four-American tally are Sergeant Nick Kay (Moe Jeudy-Lamour) of the Marine Corps, Rachel's paramour; and US Marine First Lieutenant Jason Kolchek (Paul Zinno), the squad leader of callsign Mailman 2-1. Republic Guard lieutenant Salim Othman (Nick E. Tarabay) is the sole Iraqi protagonist.

House of Ashes centres around two main character dynamics: Rachel's relationship with Eric and Nick, and Jason's relationship with Salim. After a year apart, Rachel and Eric have grown distant, leading to her affair with Nick, which can cause issues between the three throughout the game. Haunted by memories of shooting an unarmed civilian at a checkpoint, Jason is searching for his purpose in life, having enlisted in the military after the September 11 attacks in an attempt to do so, motivated by Islamophobic sentiments. Salim, a father who wishes to reunite with his son after escaping the temple, may help Jason turn their initial animosity into friendship as part of the story's core theme. With this, he can make Jason empathize with Iraqis, especially Salim's reasons for joining the war, and overcome his prejudices.

Main plot 
Eric arrives at Camp Slayer in Baghdad to debrief a team of Force Recon Marines led by Rachel about a mission to raid a village in the Arabian Desert. He tells her, Jason, Nick, and the others that there might be a facility underneath the village that stores chemical weapons by Iraqi president Saddam Hussein. Meanwhile, Salim returns home and searches for his son, carrying a birthday gift for him, but his commanding officer Cpt. Dar Basri forces Salim to intercept Eric's raid, spearheaded by Jason. Salim's squad ambushes the US troops when they arrive, but several sinkholes plunge everyone into the ancient Akkadian temple, now buried beneath the sand.

The five protagonists are separated during the fall. The Iraqis and Americans are frequently attacked by the aliens and certain reanimated humans who succumbed to the parasite inside the temple. Rachel and Jason can catch the infection later in the game. Throughout House of Ashes, the protagonists learn about the temple's history and about the remains of a failed British 1940s archaeological expedition. Led by Randolph Hodgson and Lady Bradshaw in a supposed search for Alexander the Great's tomb, the entire expedition team perished after encountering and studying the monsters; Hodgson tried but failed to destroy the temple with dynamite.

Salim explores the temple alone as the surviving marines regroup, using steel debris from a fallen truck to fight the vampires; Rachel is separated from Eric after a stand-off with Dar and falls into a blood-soaked pit. While the US forces search for ways to signal for help, she comes across an infected Clarice, abducted by the vampires earlier. Together, the two climb out of the pit, but due to Clarice's worsening state, Rachel must choose whether to abandon her or have her continue forward to medicate the illness. Regardless, Rachel reunites with her allies in the temple, after which they are promptly assaulted by the vampires. As they escape towards the catacombs below them, the Americans encounter Dar, now joined by Salim.

Salim suggests they unite to fight the monsters, to which the others reluctantly agree. The vampires continue their attack in the catacombs, splitting everyone up and killing Dar. After the assault, Salim encounters Jason and suggests to form an alliance with him; the two can choose whether to be cooperative yet distrusting of one another or become close friends. The two explore the temple and go deeper into the alien spaceship's remains, where they find the partially preserved remains of either Balathu or Kurum. Nick, and possibly Rachel and Eric, follow afterward. Once the survivors flee from another close encounter with the creatures, they further explore the spaceship and learn about the vampires' origin.

The survivors talk about a gigantic nest of hibernating vampires they found in the spaceship and incinerate it with explosives. As the cocoons burn, they escape to the surface to await extraction by a rescue team, but a total solar eclipse allows the aliens to attack the group one final time before the dispatched team arrives. During a post-credits epilogue at Camp Slayer, the located protagonists are transported—and interviewed if found alive—inside the base. The US military, planning to cover up the entire incident, begins analysis of the vampires.

Development

Inspirations and design 

House of Ashes is the third game in a series of eight planned for The Dark Pictures Anthology. The films Aliens (1986), Predator (1987), and The Descent (2005); the book At the Mountains of Madness; and the myth of the Curse of Akkad serving as inspiration for the team. House of Ashes was the first game in the anthology to be available on PlayStation 5 and Xbox Series X/S, making use of the next-generation graphics and resolution the new platforms provide. The two previous games, Man of Medan and Little Hope, received PS5/Xbox Series X/S upgrades in September 2022, which were free for those who already owned the games. Game director Will Doyle described House of Ashes as a creature feature and an exploration horror game about an ensemble cast of "trained experts" who are "beyond safety" and unable to get backup for a "critical" mission in a secluded location, where they encounter threats Doyle described as "horrible" and "inhumane". Like the other instalments, House of Ashes was designed to be a standalone story, but Supermassive Games included Easter eggs and callbacks to previous and future instalments to create a kind of shared universe within the anthology. Character models from House of Ashes predecessors were used in this game. Sara Rechena from the Portuguese edition of IGN said the design choice is reminiscent of American Horror Story.

Supermassive Games spent an extensive amount of time designing the monsters, the most complicated of their kind the team had made as of the game's release. To make the creatures lifelike, developers used both motion capture and hand animation. Executive producer Dan McDonald, in an interview with PCGamesN, said Supermassive focused on determining the monsters' physiology to achieve an "otherworldly" effect, which they did using "a bunch of props, stilts, and other things". Doyle also said the monsters' designs were created to be faceless so they would appear incomprehensible and unempathetic, and inhumane enough to "bring out the humanity" in the protagonists.

The developers implemented two new gameplay features for House of Ashes as a result of fan feedback on prior instalments in the anthology. The team created a difficulty level system for the game and overhauled the camera to make it freely movable. Because many scenes in House of Ashes involve "spookier" and more spacious areas, Supermassive found it appropriate to give players total control over the camera, which would aid in exploration and allow players to appreciate the cavernous locations. Doyle said after the release of Man of Medan and Little Hope, he noticed fans were divided about the difficulty of the QTE mechanics; many found the prompts "too easy" but others found them "too hard". In House of Ashes, players are able to toggle the speed at which QTEs appear and remain on screen. After Little Hope limited number of endings due to its use of hallucinations as a plot twist provoked a backlash, the developers incorporated a wider variety of narrative branches into House of Ashes story.

Usage of the Iraq War as setting 

McDonald said while the game is set during the 2003 invasion of Iraq, they did not intend war and politics to be its primary focus. The developers tried to treat the setting with respect. According to Tom Phillips, Doyle thought movies depicting conflicts like the Iraq War tend to dehumanise people from opposing nations. With that observation in mind, he and his team wanted to include an Iraqi protagonist in the main cast so they could represent people from both sides of the war in a nuanced light. To add further complexity, Supermassive also tied several aspects of the characters' backstories, such as Salim's desire to leave the war and go back to his son, to the invasion. During the game's production, the team consulted military specialists and Arabic speakers to ensure their depiction of 2003 Iraq was "grounded in reality" and the plot's script was of good quality.

Supermassive attributed the decision to set the game in Iraq to the country's abundance in myths and folklore the team could incorporate into the story. The developers believed the 2003–2011 Iraq War would make an "interesting" departure point for the development of the five protagonists, allowing them the opportunity for character motivations, relationships and dynamics the developers found compelling, sympathetic and complex.

Casting the lead 
For the character of Rachel King, the developers wanted to cast someone who could exhibit a "tough" personality but was simultaneously capable of showing a "soft side", and Supermassive Games decided Ashley Tisdale, known for her appearances in the High School Musical series, was fit for the role. The project would expand Tisdale's career experiences outside of her usual roles in comedy, so Tisdale agreed to provide Rachel's voice and likeness, making her debut as a video game actor. In an interview with the developers, Tisdale recounted her experiences while acting for House of Ashes and expressed excitement in her role as a CIA operative in the game:

Supermassive Games promoted Tisdale and Rachel as the House of Ashes lead. As observed by Kimberley Wallace from Game Informer, every game in the series follows this trend. Apart from House of Ashes Tisdale, she noted that Shawn Ashmore and Will Poulter also starred in the series, playing characters in Man of Medan and Little Hope respectively.

During the filming process, Supermassive used motion capture technology on Tisdale and the other voice actors to create animations for the character models. To comply with social distancing protocols during the COVID-19 pandemic, she had to avoid bodily contact with the others while enacting their scenes. Their movements were digitally edited in post-production to give the impression of contact.

Music and sound design 

The soundtrack for House of Ashes was composed by Supermassive Games's long-time collaborator Jason Graves, who had previously worked with them on music for other games in The Dark Pictures Anthology. Before the series' inception, he composed music for Until Dawn. During the early stages of House of Ashes development, Graves composed the game's score during the UK's COVID-19 pandemic lockdowns. The score makes use of string and percussion instruments, including hand drums and distorted guitars, as well as flutes and synthesisers.

The game's sound director Barney Pratt used a combination of film- and game-music editing techniques to create a cinematic, immersive atmosphere for House of Ashes. Pratt's team wanted the score's style to be shaped by the plot and gameplay. A percussive, Sumerian-style composition was used for the prologue; it progresses to a horror-themed orchestration of other instruments, adding the synthesisers after the game's twist to evoke the image of highly advanced technology. In these scores, Pratt made use of the game's "signature sound" that could convey a wide variety of emotions, ranging from "unnerving" to "dramatic". He also planned the signature sound to be subtle and encompass a vast range of "time zones, cultures, and locations", in line with the story's "consistent element[s]". Graves started working on this sound using a sample of a dove's coo, which he used as the basis for the other arrangements.

Prelude and release 
House of Ashes was first revealed in a post-credits teaser trailer at the end of Little Hope, which was released on 30 October 2020. Supermassive Games and Bandai Namco Entertainment published another teaser trailer on 19 May 2021 then officially revealed the gameplay the next week. Two story trailers provided glimpses on the game's plot; one trailer premiered at E3 2021's Summer Game Fest on 10 June and another at Gamescom 2021 on 25 August. The Gamescom trailer contains an advertisement for the game's "Pazuzu Edition" and a link to a fictional US military website that gave further details about House of Ashes lore. The Pazuzu Edition, which is the name for the game's collector's edition, included the Curator's Cut, a collector's box, an art print, a set of stickers, a figurine of one of the vampiric creatures and an eclipse-shaped button.

In early September 2021, Supermassive and Bandai Namco made a playable demo of the game available to the public. On 7 October, the companies released a character trailer introducing the main cast. House of Ashes was released for PlayStation 4, PlayStation 5, Windows, Xbox One, and Xbox Series X/S on 22 October 2021. Its release was accompanied by a trailer that includes live-action scenes of the Curator.

Reception 

Compared with Little Hope, House of Ashes sold 27% fewer physical copies in the United Kingdom upon its debut. The game entered the UK boxed charts at number six, with 48% of boxed sales coming from PS5 users. The PS4 and Xbox versions made up 36% and 16% of physical sales at the time, respectively. House of Ashes dropped to number 21 on the week of 30 October, denoting a 52% decrease in sales. Factoring in both download and physical purchases, House of Ashes reached the GSD Top 20 Games monthly chart for October, where it was placed at number 11.

Critical response 

According to Metacritic, a review aggregator, The Dark Pictures Anthology: House of Ashes received "mixed or average" reviews from critics. Upon its release, it was widely regarded as the anthology's best game to date and as an improvement over the two previous games, with a few reviews calling it a "step in the right direction" for The Dark Pictures.

William Hughes of The A.V. Club felt the anthology refreshingly took "some swings for once" with House of Ashes. Hughes felt Man of Medan and Little Hope played it too safe and went "way out of their way to step back from saying anything about anything". As a result he credits House of Ashes for not shying away from the implications of the Iraq War, notably featuring the Xenophobia and the cycle of revenge as major themes after 9/11.

The characters of House of Ashes were the subject of commentary in several reviews. Many critics praised Salim, one of the game's five protagonists, attributing his likability to his empathetic persona and friendly interactions with the other characters. Rachel Weber, a writer for GamesRadar+, appreciated the way he comes across as a "good impression" of a human being, a trait that made her invested in his survival. Richard Wakeling from GameSpot expressed admiration for Salim for the same reason, and he commended Supermassive Games for doing an "excellent job" at making the character sympathetic and humane. Reviewing House of Ashes for the website VG247, Tom Orry said Salim had the saddest backstory among the game's characters and believed he was a standout among the game's cast. Similarly, Polygon Cass Marshall described Salim as a noteworthy character with a "heartwarming" motivation to return home to his son. Marshall enjoyed many of Salim's actions and feats, such as accumulating an "enormous vampire kill count" and being willing to help the American characters despite their hostility, during House of Ashes story. As a result, Marshall called him "an absolute legend" and the game's "most valuable player".

GameSpot Wakeling said Salim's relationships with the game's other characters are House of Ashes "best and most poignant moments". He admired the developers for choosing not to portray Salim in a villainous way because of the US-led war in Iraq. In a review for the news website Destructoid, writer Jordan Devore praised Salim for his pragmatism, which is demonstrated by his prioritisation of escape from the underground temple and his insistence he and his adversaries must stop fighting if they all wish to get out alive. As a result, Devore considered Salim the most likeable and relatable of the protagonists. Two reviews on the game mention Salim's relationship with Jason. Polygon Marshall was critical of the game's tendency to focus on the Americans' mistreatment of Salim but felt satisfied by the potential "buddy cop" dynamic that could develop between Salim and Jason, calling the relationship "bittersweet". According to Game Informer Marcus Stewart, Jason's interactions with Salim appear "cheesy". He lauded the portrayal of Jason's character, and called his war trauma and character development "endearing" moments that drew Stewart close to the protagonist.

Accolades

Sequel 

The series' next game was The Dark Pictures Anthology: The Devil in Me, which was the final game in The Dark Pictures first season. The first trailer was shown at the end of House of Ashes and depicts an automated human-like mechanism created from a rotting corpse. The trailer is about a minute long and features a voiceover monologue about the "art" of serial killing.  A gold picture found in a chapter of House of Ashes previews a scene from The Devil in Me, showing a man being incinerated by an explosion caused by a mannequin.

The Devil in Me follows a five-person crew of documentary filmmakers who tour a replica of H. H. Holmes Murder Castle and are subsequently stalked by a malevolent force. The game was released on 18 November 2022 for PlayStation 4, PlayStation 5, Windows, Xbox One, and Xbox Series X/S.

Notes

References

External links 

 

2021 video games
Ancient Mesopotamia in popular culture
Bandai Namco games
Fiction about parasites
2020s horror video games
Iraq War video games
Interactive movie video games
Multiplayer and single-player video games
PlayStation 4 games
PlayStation 4 Pro enhanced games
PlayStation 5 games
Supermassive Games
Unreal Engine games
Video game sequels
Video games about vampires
Video games developed in the United Kingdom
Video games featuring female protagonists
Video games set in 2003
Video games set in antiquity
Video games set in Iraq
Video games with alternate endings
Windows games
Xbox One games
Xbox One X enhanced games
Xbox Series X and Series S games